James St. James (born James Clark; August 1, 1966) is a television personality, author, celebutante, frequent collaborator with Mathu Andersen, and former "Club Kid", a member of the New York City club scene in the late 1980s and early 1990s.

St. James was notorious for a lifestyle of excess that included heavy drug use, partying, and bizarre costumes that first brought him to national attention as the subject of television appearances and interviews. He wrote Disco Bloodbath (now published under the title Party Monster) that was later made into the feature film Party Monster (2003), starring Macaulay Culkin as Michael Alig and Seth Green as St. James. His life was the subject of the documentary Party Monster: The Shockumentary (1998).

Early life and education
James grew up in an affluent family in Saginaw, Michigan, where he lived with his mother after his parents divorced. In the summer, he would stay with his father and younger and older siblings in Fort Lauderdale, Florida, until he moved to Fort Lauderdale for high school.

Career

In the late 1980s, St. James became friendly with Michael Alig, although at first he and the other club personalities shunned the newcomer. Undeterred, Alig soon created his own scene by gathering up other creative personalities of the nightlife world; he used his flamboyant style, and engaged in self-promotion and innovative themed parties. St. James morphed from celebutante to Club Kid while helping Alig create the new scene. Alig and St. James threw many parties together, eventually setting up the Disco 2000 club night at the New York City club The Limelight. St. James wrote several columns, most famously for the short-lived New York City-based gay publication OutWeek during the magazine's two year life span, from 1989–1991.

St. James appeared many times on television talk shows to discuss the Club Kids during the 1980s and 1990s, including The Oprah Winfrey Show, The Phil Donahue Show, The Jerry Springer Show, Geraldo, and the Joan Rivers Show.

Publishing debut
St. James's debut book, Disco Bloodbath (1999), is a memoir that describes his life in the club scene, and documents the infamous rise to fame of Michael Alig and Alig's murder of Andre "Angel" Melendez. The film Party Monster: The Shockumentary (1998) was released prior to but is based on events in Disco Bloodbath, as is the film Party Monster (2003).

Freak Show and the 2000s
St. James published a second book, Freak Show in 2007, a comedy/romance about a teenage drag queen who attends a new school and forges a relationship with the football team's quarterback. Freak Show was named to the American Library Association Best Books for Young Adults list. The book was adapted into a feature in 2017 by Maven Entertainment. The film was directed by Trudie Styler, and stars Alex Lawther, Abigail Breslin, and Bette Midler.

St. James curates art shows at the World of Wonder Gallery for the production company World of Wonder, makers of both Party Monster: The Shockumentary (1998) and Party Monster (2003), and blogs regularly on World of Wonder's website, the WOW Report.

In the 2000s St. James has made regular appearances on America's Next Top Model, cycles 5, 7, & 11, presenting contest skill challenges to the aspiring models. St. James also appeared in season 2, episode 9 of RuPaul's Drag Race, where he interviewed the top four contestants on a red carpet before they walked the runway.

St. James currently has a long running webseries through the World of Wonder channel WOWPresents, titled Transformations: with James St. James. The webseries features various makeup artists, drag queens, Club Kids, and RuPaul's Drag Race alums giving St. James themed makeovers.

Bibliography
 (Now published under the title "Party Monster") recreated as the feature film Party Monster starring Macaulay Culkin as Alig and Seth Green as St. James.

Filmography
 Party Monster: The Shockumentary (1998); extensive interviews describing clubbing in the 1980s/1990s, directed by Fenton Bailey and Randy Barbato
 Party Monster (2003)
 Freak Show (2018)

References

External links
 (St. James's Online Blog)

1966 births
20th-century American male writers
20th-century American non-fiction writers
21st-century American non-fiction writers
American drag queens
American male non-fiction writers
American memoirists
Club Kids
American gay writers
LGBT people from Michigan
Living people
People from Saginaw, Michigan
Writers from Fort Lauderdale, Florida
21st-century American male writers